The canton of Angers-5 is an administrative division of the Maine-et-Loire department, in western France. It was created at the French canton reorganisation which came into effect in March 2015. Its seat is in Angers.

It consists of the following communes:
Angers (partly)
Briollay 
Cantenay-Épinard 
Écouflant 
Écuillé 
Feneu 
Soulaire-et-Bourg

References

Cantons of Maine-et-Loire